Juan Zunzunegui (born 31 March 1976) is a Spanish rower. He competed at the 2000 Summer Olympics and the 2004 Summer Olympics.

References

1976 births
Living people
Spanish male rowers
Olympic rowers of Spain
Rowers at the 2000 Summer Olympics
Rowers at the 2004 Summer Olympics
Sportspeople from Vigo